Derek Justin Hart (born December 1, 1992) is an American football long snapper who is currently a free agent. He played college football at James Madison.

Professional career
Hart signed a reserve/future contract with the Green Bay Packers on March 31, 2017. He was waived on August 28, 2017. He was re-signed by the Packers on November 3, 2017 to replace an injured Taybor Pepper. He was released by the Packers on November 14, 2017 after the team re-signed longtime snapper Brett Goode.

College 
Played in 43 games at James Madison— serving as the Dukes' primary long snapper for three seasons.

High school 
In 2011, his senior year, Hart won the boys' Class AAA high jump for Pennsylvania District Class AAA track and field clearing 6'8". Hart also took second in the high hurdles with a time of 14.94. Played a part in Manheim Central football's 2009 District 3 Triple-A championship.

References

Living people
1992 births
American football long snappers
American football tight ends
Players of American football from Pennsylvania
James Madison Dukes football players
Green Bay Packers players
People from Manheim, Pennsylvania